Action Man is a 2000 CGI animated TV series based on the toy line of the same name. Though unrelated to the 1995 version, it was the first Action Man series to be made in CGI. In this series, Alexander "Alex" Mann is an extreme sports athlete known as "Action Man" and is a member of Team Xtreme. The show's theme song "Amp it up Action Man" was written and performed by Saban Entertainment's Paul Gordon.

Synopsis
Alex Mann, Action Man's civilian identity, is an extreme sports athlete of Team Xtreme, taking part in the Mastervision Network's Acceleration Games, a series of unconventional televised sporting activities all over the world. Danger and adrenaline trigger hidden mental powers called the "AMP (Advanced Macro Probability) Factor"; a result of secret experiments by his former high school coach Simon Grey. With it, Alex is able to calculate all future possibilities, choosing the best course of action. Alex "Action" Mann, Desmond "Grinder" Sinclair, Agnes "Fidget" Wilson, and Ricky Singh-Baines must stop arch-enemy Doctor X, a brilliant geneticist and bio-engineer, who will stop at nothing to duplicate Alex's AMP Factor to rebuild Earth with the genetically enhanced neo-humanity.

Cast

Main
 Mark Hildreth as Action Man / Alex Mann
 Michael Dobson as Desmond "Grinder" Sinclair
 Tabitha St. Germain as Agnes "Fidget" Wilson
 Peter Kelamis as Ricky Singh-Baines
 Christopher Judge as Coach Simon Gray
 Tyler Labine as Brandon Caine
 Michael Kopsa as Doctor X (new body)
 Campbell Lane as Doctor X (original body)
 Andrew Francis as Tempest / Templeton Storm
 Janyse Jaud as Asazi
 Garry Chalk as Gangrene / Dr. Wolfgang Greenholtz
 Ian James Corlett as Quake / Sydney

Supporting
 Mackenzie Gray as Nick Masters
 Venus Terzo as Agent Diana Zurvis
 Michael Donovan
 Kirby Morrow as Jimmy Woo
 Ian James Corlett
 Brian Drummond as Craig

Episodes

Season 1 (2000)
Dr. X captured and physically tested Alex Mann repeatedly, as well as his longtime rival & best friend Brandon Caine. Dr. X also added nanotech enhancements to Brandon, making him superior to Alex in athletics, only for them to have side effects. The culmination of the experiments was to mind transfer Dr. X into Brandon's body, becoming his younger self & nanotech cyborg, able to change his appearance and infect others. Following the ninth episode the series becomes more simplified. Dr. X founded the Council of Doom with his evil cohorts: assassin Asazi and weather manipulating scientist Tempest. Dr. X's nanotech trilobites appeared to gain collective intelligence and rebel against him, but this was actually Brandon Caine's uploaded mind punishing Dr. X.

Season 2 (2001)
The Council of Doom continues to grow after Brandon was saved from Dr. X. The season features new villains: Gangrene & Quake.

Home media releases
In the United Kingdom, three VHS were released by 20th Century Fox Home Entertainment and later reissued by Buena Vista Home Entertainment, containing three episodes per tape. One VHS release was also released by Maximum Entertainment.

VHS releases

The series also saw a few DVD releases as well, released in the UK by Maximum Entertainment.

Video games
A video game named Action Man: Search for Base X was released based on the 2000 series.

Hasbro Interactive published the Windows game Action Man: Raid on Island X in the United States as a tie-in to the TV series, despite having nothing to do with it.

Awards
In 2001, the show won a Golden Camera Award at the U.S. and International Film and Video Festival for 'Best Animation' in the episode "The Swarm: Part 2".

References

External links
 
IMDB: Episode list for "Action Man" (2000)
TV.com: Action Man (2000) Episode Guide

2000s American animated television series
2000 American television series debuts
2001 American television series endings
2000s Canadian animated television series
2000 Canadian television series debuts
2001 Canadian television series endings
American children's animated action television series
American children's animated adventure television series
American children's animated science fantasy television series
American computer-animated television series
Canadian children's animated action television series
Canadian children's animated adventure television series
Canadian children's animated science fantasy television series
Canadian computer-animated television series
Cyberpunk television series
English-language television shows
Fox Kids
Fox Broadcasting Company original programming
Works by Len Wein
Television shows based on Hasbro toys
Espionage television series
Fictional super soldiers
Television shows adapted into video games
Television series by Saban Entertainment
Television series by Rainmaker Studios